For lists of Croatia national football team results see:

 Croatia national football team results (1940–1991)
 Croatia national football team results (1992–1999)
 Croatia national football team results (2000–2009)
 Croatia national football team results (2010–2019)
 Croatia national football team results (2020–present)

results